Shimbay (Karakalpak: Шымбай, Shımbay), also known as Chimbay is a city and seat of Shimbay district in Karakalpakstan. Its population is 50,400 (2016).

Climate

Shimbay has a cold desert climate (Köppen climate classification BWk), with cold winters and hot summers. Rainfall is generally light and erratic, and occurs mainly in the winter and autumn months.

Transportation

The road south out of Shimbay connects to Xaliqabat and Nukus. Another road leads northeast to Qaraózek and Taxtakópir.

References

Populated places in Karakalpakstan
Cities in Uzbekistan